Entain plc, formerly GVC Holdings, is an international sports betting and gambling company. It is listed on the London Stock Exchange and is a constituent of the FTSE 100 Index. It owns brands such as bwin, Coral, Ladbrokes, PartyPoker and Sportingbet.

History
The company was founded in Luxembourg in 2004 as Gaming VC Holdings. In 2010, it was reorganised as GVC Holdings.

In 2012 GVC and William Hill bought Sportingbet, with William Hill taking the Australian and Spanish markets, and GVC taking the rest of the world.

GVC acquired Bwin.Party Digital Entertainment in 2016 for £1.1bn after a bidding battle with rival gambling group 888 Holdings, leading to a marked recovery in GVC's financial situation. Since the acquisition, bwin.party has returned to growth after many years of falling sales.

In December 2017, GVC Holdings agreed to buy Ladbrokes Coral in a deal which could be worth up to £4 billion. The acquisition was completed in March 2018.

In mid-2018 a shareholder rebellion forced out GVC director, Peter Isola, after reports showed that two executives at the company earned a disproportionate £67 million in salary.

In July 2018, the UK owner of Ladbrokes and Coral agreed a $200 million deal with MGM Resorts to capitalise on the newly liberalised US sports betting market.

On March 22, 2019, GVC confirmed that chairman Lee Feldman would leave the company on or before the company's annual general meeting on June 5. While Feldman was overdue to leave under UK corporate governance code that recommends chairs of listed companies not stay in position longer than nine years, the news came two weeks after Feldman sold £6m worth of his GVC shares and CEO Kenny Alexander sold shares worth £13.7m, which led to GVC's share price falling nearly 14% in a single day. Barry Gibson took over as Chairman upon Lee Feldman's departure.

In July 2020, Shay Segev, GVC's chief operating officer (COO), succeeded Alexander as CEO following his "surprise departure" after 13 years in charge. Also In July 2020, the UK tax authority HM Revenue and Customs announced that it was widening the scope of its investigation into “potential corporate offending” by an unspecified entity or entities within the GVC group related to the company’s former Turkish-facing online gambling business, which GVC sold in December 2017. GVC dismissed public reports that the HMRC probe was related to insolvent payment processor Wirecard, saying there was “no evidence of any link between the HMRC investigation and the payment service providers mentioned in the newspaper report.”

In September 2020, GVC announced that it would be changing its name to Entain plc and that it was committing to only operate in regulated markets by 2023.

On 9 December, GVC Holdings plc changed its name to Entain following a shareholder vote.

In 2021, Entain's joint venture partner MGM Resorts made an offer to buy Entain, valuing the business at $11 billion. The board and Segev rejected the offer saying, that it "significantly undervalues the company and its prospects". MGM Resorts subsequently withdrew the offer.

On 11 January 2021, Shay Segev announced he was stepping down as Entain CEO to become co-CEO at video streaming service DAZN. On 20 January 2021, Entain appointed Jette Nygaard-Andersen as its new Chief Executive Officer & Director, making her the first woman to lead a UK-listed gambling company. Rob Wood was promoted to become Deputy CEO while still retaining his CFO duties.

In August 2021, Entain acquired US-based esports betting company Unikrn for £50 million.

In November 2021 it was reported that Entain had sold the Betdaq business back to original founder Dermot Desmond. The sale came eight years after the business was acquired by Ladbrokes (now owned by Entain), and although the amount of the sale is unknown, reports suggest it is substantially less than £25 million the company was originally acquired for.

In February 2022, Entain announced it has acquired the Canadian sports betting operator Sports Interaction from Avid Gaming for £175 million.

In November 2022, it was announced Entain had acquired the Croatian sports betting company, SuperSport.

In January 2023, it was announced Entain had completed the €450 million acquisition of Dutch online gambling company, BetCity from its parent company, Sports Entertainment Media.

Operations
Entain is headquartered in the Isle of Man and has licences in more than 18 countries. The Group employs over 2,800 employees and contractors in locations across Europe, Oceania, Asia, North and South America.

Entain-owned brands
Entain operates consumer-facing brands in the online gambling industry, including:

Sports labels

Betboo
Betboo was established in 2005 and provides online bingo, sportsbook, casino and poker to South American customers. It was acquired by the GVC Group in July 2009.

BetMGM
In July 2018, GVC announced a 50/50 joint venture with US Hotel and Casino operator MGM Resorts International to create a sports betting and online gaming platform targeting the U.S. market in states where such activities are legal.

bwin
bwin is Entain's main sports betting brand in continental Europe. Its core markets include Germany, Italy, Spain, France and Belgium. As well as sports bets, bwin has a variety of table and slot casino games as well as online poker where licensed to do so.
The bwin brand has been associated with sponsorship of a number of football teams including Real Madrid, A.C. Milan, Bayern Munich, Manchester Utd and Juventus. The brand currently sponsors four Spanish La Liga clubs: Valencia CF, Villarreal CF, Sevilla FC and Atlético Madrid.

In February 2018, GVC Holdings was fined £350,000 by the UK Gambling Commission for repeated failings from ElectraWorks Limited. The company was punished for infringements relating to the advertising of free bets and bonus offers.

Gamebookers
Gamebookers is a full-service sportsbook that was initially acquired by PartyGaming in 2006. GVC then acquired the brand in February 2016 as part of the acquisition of bwin.party.

Ladbrokes & Coral
As of 29 March 2018, GVC Holdings took over the Ladbrokes Coral Group. This included their UK bookmaker estate, a new business for GVC bringing the two customer brands Ladbrokes and Coral into the corporate portfolio.

Neds
Neds was established in 2017 and serves the Australian sports betting market. It was acquired by GVC in 2018 for $A95 million.

Sportingbet
Sportingbet was established over 15 years ago in 1998 and was acquired by GVC in March 2013. It provides online and mobile sports betting, casinos, games and poker. In October 2012, Sportingbet announced that it had agreed to preliminary terms for a £530 million takeover bid from both GVC and William Hill. Under these terms, Sportingbet's Australian and Spanish operations were bought by William Hill.

Games labels

partypoker
partypoker was founded in 2001 and in the early 2000s was the world's largest online poker site. The company's US-driven revenues were hit by the passing of the Unlawful Internet Gambling Enforcement Act (UIGEA) in the United States. The company merged with Austrian sport's betting company bwin in 2011, and was acquired by GVC in 2015. In 2016 partypoker launched a windows mobile app and saw significant growth after bwin.party was acquired by GVC in the same year. In 2018, the partypoker brand was placed under the control of GVC's BetMGM joint venture.

partycasino
Following the 2011 merger of PartyGaming PLC and bwin Interactive Entertainment AG, partycasino became one of GVC's leading casino brands.

CasinoClub
CasinoClub was originally launched in 2001 and acquired by GVC in 2004, it largely operates in German-speaking markets and has more than 15,000 active customers.

Gioco Digitale
Gioco Digitale was the first fully regulated gambling site on the Italian market launched in 2008. It has positioned itself as a gambling portal for casual users, with a focus on bingo and casino products. The company was originally acquired by bwin Interactive Entertainment AG in 2009.

Cashcade
Cashcade Ltd is a UK-based online gambling marketing company that is now a wholly owned subsidiary of GVC Holdings. Cashcade was originally acquired by PartyGaming PLC in July 2009. The company became part of the GVC group when it was purchased as part of the acquisition of bwin.party digital entertainment in February 2017. Cashcade owns FoxyGames.com, FoxyBingo.com and CheekyBingo.com.

Foxy Bingo
This online bingo site was first launched in 2005 and the brand is owned by Cashcade. During its advertising history it has had many campaigns featuring Foxy - a human-sized fox mascot. He wears a smart suit and has a northern accent. Throughout its brand history, there have been several celebrity tie-ups including with Katie Price and Joey Essex.

Foxy Games
Foxy Games was established in April 2015 as Foxy Casino and is the slots-led counterpart of its sister brand Foxy Bingo.

References

External links
 

 
Companies listed on the London Stock Exchange
Holding companies established in 2004
Online gambling companies of the Isle of Man
Offshore companies of the Isle of Man